The Samfrau Geosyncline or Samfrau Orogeny is an orogenic belt that was active in the Palaeozoic and early Mesozoic in Gondwanaland, formed by small terranes and deep accumulations of old sediment dumped off the continent's edge by erosion, accreting against the Pacific-side coast of Gondwanaland due to subduction. Its name (as "Samfrau Geosyncline") was coined by Alexander du Toit. Parts of it exist now in northern Argentina, South Africa, Antarctica, and part of the east coast region of Australia, as shown in this map.

References
Flood basalts subduction and the break-up of Gondwanaland, K.G. Cox, Department of Geology and Mineralogy, University of Oxford, on www.neotectonica.ufpr.br (16 September 2011)
Gondwanide continental collision and the origin of Patagonia, R.J. Pankhurst, C.W. Rapela, C.M. Fanning, M. Márquez, Earth Sci Rev 76(3-4):235-257 (June 2006)

External links
Google search for articles
Google search for maps and other images

Orogenies of Antarctica
Orogenies of Australia
Orogenies of South America
Paleozoic orogenies
Mesozoic orogenies